Gheorghe Dinică (1 January 1934 – 10 November 2009) was a Romanian actor.

Career
Dinică showed an early interest in acting, being part of different amateur theater troupes since he was 17. In 1957, he entered The National Institute of Theatre and Cinematography Art in Bucharest. He graduated in 1961, already drawing public attention with the role of Inspector Goole in the graduation play An Inspector Calls. Since then, Gheorghe Dinică performed for some of the most important Romanian theatres:
 1961-1967 Comedy Theatre, Bucharest
 1968-1969 Bulandra Theatre, Bucharest
 since 1972 I.L.Caragiale National Theatre, Bucharest

Dinică was also a Romanian director and popular film actor, thus acting mostly in Romanian films. Like the French actor Alain Delon, Dinică refused to act in movies produced in the United States.

Since 2002, Dinică was an honorary member of the society of I.L.Caragiale National Theatre. He is also an honorary citizen of the city of Bucharest. He was awarded the "Faithful Service" Order in the Grand Officer class.

Dinica died of cardiac arrest at Floreasca Emergency Hospital, Bucharest. For his popularity in Romania, he received an offer from Walt Disney Pictures, and provided the voice of Scrooge McDuck in 1996 for the Romanian version of the series, Duck Tales.

Activity

Theatre

1961: Famous 702 directed by M.Ghelerter
1962: Sweik in the Second World War by B.Brecht, directed by L.Giurchescu
1962: The Trial of Mr. Caragiale by M.Ștefănescu, directed by D.Esrig
1962: Wedding at the Castle by S.Andras, directed by L.Giurchescu
1963: The Shadow by E.Svarț, directed by D.Esrig
1964: Rhinoceros by Eugène Ionesco, directed by L.Giurchescu
1964: The Sleepy Adventure by T.Mazilu, directed by D.Cernescu
1965: Troilus and Cressida by William Shakespeare, directed by D.Esrig
1966: The Duck Head by G.Ciprian, directed by D.Esrig
1967: Public Opinion by Aurel Baranga, directed by A.Baranga
1968: Rameau's Nephew by Denis Diderot directed by D.Esrig
1969: Death of Danton by Georg Büchner directed by Liviu Ciulei
1973: Three Venetian Twins directed by David Esrig
1977: Romulus the Great by Friedrich Dürrenmatt, directed by Sanda Manu
1978: Gaițele, directed by Horea Popescu
1979: A Lost Letter by Ion Luca Caragiale, directed by Radu Beligan
1980: Waiting for Godot by Samuel Beckett, directed by Grigore Gonţa
1986: Ioneștii directed by Grigore Gonţa
1990: Who Needs Theatre? directed by Andrei Şerban
1991: Night of Kings by William Shakespeare, directed by Andrei Şerban
1997: Technic of Heaven by Mihai Ispirescu, directed by Dan Micu
1998: Night Asilum by Maxim Gorki, directed by Ion Cojar
1999: The Name of the Rose adapted from Umberto Eco, directed by Grigore Gonţa
1999: Pork Chops by Bertrand Blier, directed by Gelu Colceag
2000: And Relieve Eminescu Already by Tiberiu Cristian Popescu, directed by Grigore Gonţa
2001: Take, Ianke and Cadâr by V.I.Popa, directed by Grigore Gonța
2003: The Last Hour by Mihail Sebastian, directed by Anca Ovanez Doroşenco

Filmography

1963: The Stranger (directed by Mihai Iacob) as Jurca
1964: The Treasure from Vadul Vechi (directed by Victor Iliu) as Zamfir
1966: The White Trial (directed by Iulian Mihu) as Vasile Dumitrana
1966: Golgota (directed by regia Mircea Drăgan) as Sergentul
1966: Dacii (directed by Sergiu Nicolaescu) as Roman Gen. Fuscus (voice)
1967: The Major and Death (directed by Alexandru Boiangiu) as Maiorul Tache
1968: The Column (directed by Mircea Drăgan) as Bastus - Dacian Traitor
1969: Neînfricatii (directed by Iulian Mihu)
1970: Judgement (directed by Ferenc Kósa)
1970: Prea mic pentru un razboi atît de mare (directed by Radu Gabrea) as Plutonierul veteran
1972: Atunci i-am condamnat pe toţi la moarte (directed by Sergiu Nicolaescu) as Notar
1972: With Clean Hands (directed by Sergiu Nicolaescu) as Lascarica
1972: The Barrier (directed by Mircea Mureşan) as pungasul Ionel Calaretu
1972: Felix and Otilia (directed by Iulian Mihu) as Stanica Ratiu
1973: Explosion (directed by Mircea Drăgan) as Salamander
1974: Beyond the Sands (directed by Radu Gabrea) as maiorul Ionescu
1974: Un comisar acuză (directed by Sergiu Nicolaescu) as Paraipan
1974: The Jderi Brothers (directed by Mircea Drăgan) as Dumitru Crivat
1974: The Prodigal Father (directed by Adrian Petringenaru) as Marin
1974: Nemuritorii (directed by Sergiu Nicolaescu) as Postelnicul Butnaru
1974: We Do Not Film Just for Fun (directed by Iulian Mihu)
1975: Stephen the Great - Vaslui 1475 (directed by Mircea Drăgan) - Sultan Mahomed II
1975: Filip the Kind (directed by Dan Piţa) - Lupu
1975: Postcards with Wild Flowers (directed by Andrei Blaier) as Marin, responsabil de la Alimentara
1975: Escape (directed by Ştefan Traian Roman) as Capitanul Stoian
1975: Mastodont (directed by Virgil Calotescu) as Ilarie Micu
1975: The Wall (directed by Constantin Vaeni) as  Savu
1976: Through the Ashes of the Empire (directed by A.Blaier) as escrocul Diplomatul
1976: The Doom (directed by Sergiu Nicolaescu) as Gendarme Chief Ion
1976: Three Days and Three Nights (directed by Dinu Tănase)
1976: Oil! (directed by Mircea Drăgan) as George
1976: Opening (directed by Mihai Constantinescu)
1977: The Great Loner (directed by Iulian Mihu)
1977: Stairway to the Sky (directed by A.Blaier) as Vitcu
1978: "Bus" Action (directed by Virgil Calotescu) as Armand the Baron
1978: Doctor Poenaru (directed by Dinu Tănase) as Judecatorul Mircea Voican
1978: Revenge (directed by Sergiu Nicolaescu) as Paraipan
1978: Uncertain Roads (directed by Virgil Calotescu) as Onisor Borcea
1978: Everything for Football (directed by A.Blaier)
1979: Poor Ioanide (directed by Dan Piţa) as Gonzalv Ionescu
1980: Last Night of Love (directed by Sergiu Nicolaescu) as Constantin Mavrodin
1980: Network S (directed by Virgil Calotescu) as spionul Eugen Panait
1981: A World with no Sky (directed by Mircea Drăgan) as Sergentul
1982: Intîlnirea (directed by Sergiu Nicolaescu)
1982: The Contest (directed by Dan Piţa) as Mitica
1982: White Darkness (directed by Andrei Blaier) as Arbitru strain de fotbal
1982: Why Are the Bells Ringing, Mitica? (directed by Lucian Pintilie) as Nae
1983: Laugh as in Life (directed by A.Blaier) as Inginerul sef
1983: On the Left Bank of Blue Danube (directed by Malvina Urşianu) as majordomul Matei
1984: The Secret of Bacchus (directed by G.Saizescu) as Cercel
1984: Dangerous Flight (directed by Francisc Munteanu) as Oprescu
1984: A light on the 10th Floor (directed by Malvina Urşianu) as Avocat Mitrana
1984: Acordati circumstante atenuante? (directed by Lucian Bratu)
1984: A Patch of Sky (directed by Francisc Munteanu)
1984: Heroes Have No Age (TV Movie, directed by Mihai Constantinescu)
1984: Ciresarii (directed by Adrian Petringenaru)
1985: Sentimental Summer (directed by Francisc Munteanu) as Coman, presedintele C.A.P.-ului Viitorul
1987: The Wasps Nest (directed by Horia Popescu) as Georges
1987: The Secret of Nemesis (directed by G.Saizescu) as N. M. Sisescu
1987: Let Me Tell You About Me (directed by Mihai Constantinescu)
1987: The Extras (directed by Malvina Urşianu)
1989: Moment of Truth (directed by A.Blaier)
1989: Sky's Tear (directed by A.Istrătescu Lener)
1989: Divorce out of Love (directed by A.Blaier)
1991: Divort... din dragoste (directed by A.Blaier) as Lawyer
1991: The House from the Dream (directed by Ioan Cărmăzan) as Cäpäläu
1993: The Conjugal Bed (directed by Mircea Daneliuc) as Vasile Potop
1993: High School Students in Alert (directed by Mircea Plângău) as Patron magazin
1993: Look Ahead in Anger (directed by Nicolae Mărgineanu) as Dimos
1993: The Earth's Most Beloved Son (directed by Şerban Marinescu) as investigator of the Securitate
1994: Chira Chiralina (directed by Gyula Maar) as Apa
1994: The Mirror (directed by Sergiu Nicolaescu) as Mihai Antonescu
1994: The Stone Cross (directed by A.Blaier) as Mache Puzderie
1995: Terente – King of the Swamps (directed by A.Blaier)
1995: The Idle Princess of the Old Court (directed by Mircea Veroiu) as Maiorica Arnoteanu
1999: The Famous Paparazzo (directed by Nicolae Mărgineanu) as Procurorul
2000: Manipularea (directed by Nicolae Opritescu)
2001: War in the Kitchen (directed by Marius Theodor Barna)
2001: The Afternoon of a Torturer (directed by Lucian Pintilie) as Frant Tandara
2002: Patul lui Procust (directed by Viorica Meșină, Sergiu Prodan) as Nae Gheorghidiu
2002: Filantropica (directed by Nae Caranfil) as Pavel Puiut
2002: The Tower of Pisa (directed by Şerban Marinescu)
2003: Exam (directed by Titus Muntean) as Dumitrascu
2003: Sweet Sauna of Death (directed by Andrei Blaier) as Lama
2004: Orient Express (directed by Sergiu Nicolaescu) as Costache
2004: Tycoon (directed by Şerban Marinescu) as Gheorghe Manasia
2004: The Manipulation (directed by Marius Theodor Barna)
2004: Emperor Aleodor (directed by Radu Dumitru Penescu) as Bondar (voice)
2005: Un om grabit (L' Homme press) (TV Movie, directed by Sebastien Grall) as Zacharie Regencrantz
2005: Bani de dus, bani de-ntors (TV Movie, directed by Alexandru Tocilescu) as Manole
2005:  (directed by Marian Baciu)
2006: White Palms (directed by Szabolcs Hajdu) as Zacharie Regencrantz
2007: Ticalosii (directed by Serban Marinescu) as Recycled Securist
2007: Inima de tigan (TV Series, directed by Aurica Fieraru) as Aurică Fieraru
2008: Regina (TV Series, directed by Larry Maronese, Iura Luncasu, Alex Fotea) as Aurica Fieraru (2008-2009)
2009: Weekend with my Mother (directed by Stere Gulea) as Grandfather
2009: The House of Terror (directed by Peter Engert)
2009: Aniela (directed by Iura Luncasu, Bogdan Dumitrescu) as Gen. Vulturescu (2009-2010)
2015: Soapte de amor (directed by Mircea Daneliuc) as Doctor (final film role)

References

External links 
 

1934 births
2009 deaths
Burials at Bellu Cemetery
Male actors from Bucharest
Romanian male film actors
Members of the Romanian Orthodox Church
Romanian male stage actors
20th-century Romanian male actors
21st-century Romanian male actors